Brad Korn (born August 22, 1981) is an American basketball coach who is the current head coach of the Southeast Missouri State Redhawks men's basketball team.

Playing career
Korn played four years at Southern Illinois, three under Bruce Weber and one under Matt Painter and was a member of three-straight Salukis' NCAA Tournament appearances, including the Sweet 16 in 2002.

Coaching career
Korn would transition from playing to the Salukis' coaching staff under Chris Lowery, where he was part of another three-straight NCAA Tournament appearances and a Sweet 16 appearance in 2007. Following Lowery's firing from Southern Illinois, Korn joined Weber's staff at Kansas State for one season as the director of basketball operations before becoming an assistant coach at Missouri State from 2013 to 2016. He'd return to Kansas State in 2016 as an assistant coach, in which the Wildcats had three-straight NCAA Tournament appearances, capped by an Elite Eight run in 2018.

On March 24, 2020, Korn was introduced as the seventh head coach in the Division I era at Southeast Missouri State, replacing Rick Ray.

Head coaching record

References

1981 births
Living people
American men's basketball coaches
Basketball coaches from Illinois
Southeast Missouri State Redhawks men's basketball coaches
Kansas State Wildcats men's basketball coaches
Missouri State Bears basketball coaches
Southern Illinois Salukis men's basketball coaches
Southern Illinois Salukis men's basketball players
Sportspeople from the Chicago metropolitan area
Basketball players from Illinois
People from Oswego, Illinois